The Ritz Theatre is an active live producing non-profit theatre located in Haddon Township, Camden County, New Jersey. It is home to The Ritz Theatre Company (formerly Puttin' on the Ritz, Inc.) The company produces mainstage plays and musicals, children's theater, runs a summer theatre arts day camp, and reaches out to its community with educational and entertaining programming.

History
The Ritz Theatre was built in a Colonial Revival and opened in September 1927 as a vaudeville theatre. It quickly became a focal point of the community. The architecture is Greek Revival with the auditorium walls featuring 25-foot high neo-classical canvas murals with gilt trimmed columns and velvet draped balconies enclosed by classic carved balustrades.

In the 1950s and 1960s, the Ritz was known for its fine art and foreign film showings, drawing audiences from Philadelphia and the Southern New Jersey regions. In the 1970s, the Ritz then became an adult movie theater. The theatre closed until 1985, when the Ritz returned to live theatre when Puttin’ on the Ritz, Inc., a production company led by Producing Artistic Director Bruce A. Curless, took over.

In January 1986, Puttin’ On The Ritz reopened the doors of the Ritz Theatre, to once again become the focal point of South Jersey entertainment. The first production of Puttin’ on The Ritz was the musical The Boy Friend by Sandy Wilson. In 1990, the theatre's production of Children of a Lesser God would begin a long time commitment an ASL (American Sign Language) Initiative. This initiative would later turn into having Shadow Interpreters for the theatre's annual Christmas tradition of Scrooge in 2006 and 2008, as well as mainstage shows such as Arsenic and Old Lace in 2010.

The Ritz Theatre Company, Inc. presents six mainstage productions and eight children's productions each season.  They serve more than 73,300 patrons annually. Also offered are holiday shows, special events, summer theatre camp, dramatic workshops and outreach programs.  The Theatre building also boasts The Gallery at the Ritz, an in-house art gallery that offers professional monthly art exhibits.

Being a non-profit company, there is an active board of directors. In 2001, the group purchased the 466-seat theatre, making it the permanent home of the ensemble. In 2002, the Ritz was added to the New Jersey and National Register of Historic Places.

It is currently in the midst of renovation. To date, the roof has been replaced along with upgrading the electrical system and installing sprinklers. The lobby has been renovated with new carpeting and paint and work has begun on restoration of the front of the building and the classic marquee as well as the classical Greek interior murals.

In April 2014, the Ritz held its first ever fundraiser to help raise money to keep the building and theatre alive. The first annual “Rock The Ritz” fundraiser brought in over $11,000 to help the organization.

In 2015, The Ritz will enter its 30th season providing live theatre to South Jersey and the surrounding areas.

Notable people
Cristin Milioti: Tony Award Nominated Actress for the Musical, Once.  Played The Mother on the final season of the TV series How I Met Your Mother. Ritz productions include Carousel, Romeo and Juliet, as well as the Christmas tradition of Scrooge.

See also
National Register of Historic Places listings in Camden County, New Jersey

References

External links
 Ritz Theatre Online
 National Register of Historic Places
  Ritz Theatre at Cinematreasures.org

Buildings and structures in Camden County, New Jersey
Theatres in New Jersey
Theatres completed in 1927
1927 establishments in New Jersey
Tourist attractions in Camden County, New Jersey
Haddon Township, New Jersey
National Register of Historic Places in Camden County, New Jersey
Colonial Revival architecture in New Jersey
Vaudeville theaters
Theatres on the National Register of Historic Places in New Jersey